Aneta Matei (born 15 June 1948) is a Romanian rowing cox. She competed at the 1976 Summer Olympics and the 1980 Summer Olympics.

References

External links
 

1948 births
Living people
Romanian female rowers
Olympic rowers of Romania
Rowers at the 1976 Summer Olympics
Rowers at the 1980 Summer Olympics
Sportspeople from Timișoara
Coxswains (rowing)
World Rowing Championships medalists for Romania